The 1940–41 Washington Huskies men's basketball team represented the University of Washington for the  NCAA college basketball season. Led by 21st-year head coach Hec Edmundson, the Huskies were members of the Pacific Coast Conference and played their home games on campus at the UW Pavilion in Seattle, Washington.

Washington opened conference play with four wins, but then lost nine straight; they won their last three to climb out of

References

External links
Sports Reference – Washington Huskies: 1940–41 basketball season
Washington Huskies men's basketball media guide (2009–10) – History

Washington Huskies men's basketball seasons
Washington Huskies
Washington
Washington